Adrien Daniel Karoly Regattin (born 22 August 1991) is a professional footballer who plays for Turkish club Pendikspor. Born in France, he made one appearance for the Morocco national team in 2012.

Career
Regattin left Süper Lig club Akhisar Belediyespor after the 2018–19 season.

On 5 February 2020, Regattin joined MLS side Cincinnati. He parted with the club by mutual agreement in September 2020.

On 25 September 2020, Regattin joined Turkish club Altay.

On 29 July 2021, he joined Volos on a free transfer.

Career statistics

References

External links
 

1991 births
French sportspeople of Moroccan descent
People from Sète
Sportspeople from Hérault
Footballers from Occitania (administrative region)
Living people
French footballers
Moroccan footballers
Morocco international footballers
Association football midfielders
Toulouse FC players
Ankaraspor footballers
Akhisarspor footballers
FC Cincinnati players
Altay S.K. footballers
Volos N.F.C. players
Pendikspor footballers
Ligue 1 players
Süper Lig players
TFF First League players
Major League Soccer players
Super League Greece players
Moroccan expatriate footballers
French expatriate footballers
Expatriate footballers in Turkey
Moroccan expatriate sportspeople in Turkey
French expatriate sportspeople in Turkey
Expatriate soccer players in the United States
Moroccan expatriate sportspeople in the United States
French expatriate sportspeople in the United States
Expatriate footballers in Greece
Moroccan expatriate sportspeople in Greece
French expatriate sportspeople in Greece